The Whitby Rail Maintenance Facility is a GO Transit  rolling stock maintenance facility in Whitby, Ontario, Canada. The depot lies between Victoria Street East and GO Transit's Lakeshore East line just east of South Blair Street. It is a secondary depot, the primary depot being the Willowbrook Rail Maintenance Facility along GO Transit's Lakeshore West line. 

Plenary Infrastructure, a consortium, is responsible for maintenance and repairs to the facility under a 30-year contract. Bombardier Transportation maintains rolling stock within the facility. Metrolinx owns the facility.

History
In its planning stage, the depot was originally called East Rail Maintenance Facility, but by opening day became known as the Whitby Rail Maintenance Facility. By 2015, the consortium Plenary Infrastructure was awarded a $859.2-million contract to design, build and finance the facility, and maintain it for 30 years. Of the $859.2-million contract cost, the Province of Ontario contributed $764.4 million and the federal government $94.8 million. Construction started in the summer of 2012 with Construction Substantial Completion awarded on March 14, 2018.

The depot will support GO Transit Regional Express Rail, offering faster, more frequent commuter train service across the Greater Toronto Region. 	Another reason for building the Whitby Rail Maintenance Facility was to reduce the operational risk of having only one depot. It povides operational flexibility under emergency situations in case there are operational issues at the Willowbrook Rail Maintenance Facility).

Facilities
The Whitby Rail Maintenance Facility has capacity to accommodate 22 twelve-car trains but was expected to house only 13 upon its opening. It provides mechanical maintenance, body repair, as well as daily cleaning and operational services. It is designed to support 30 years of future service expansion as well as the future electrification of GO Transit rail lines. The facility requires 300 to 400 workers.

The  site has the following features:
 Shop area in the main building of about 
 13 on-site storage bays for 12-car passenger trains:
 2 preventative maintenance bays
 11 canopy tracks for storage
 11 bays for locomotive repair
 12 bays for coach repair
 Dedicated buildings for paint shop, locomotive wash, track maintenance, passenger train wash, and wheel shop
 Administrative offices with crew centre in the main building
 Over  of track
 68 train switches

The facility has Gold Certification for Leadership in Energy and Environmental Design (LEED). Environmental features include:
 Reflective roof materials to limit solar radiation
 Natural lighting throughout the main building
 Rainwater collection for wash stations and washrooms
 Diversion and storage of rainwater
 Electric automobile charging stations, dedicated car pool parking area

References

External links
  published by Stantec

Rail infrastructure in the Regional Municipality of Durham
GO Transit
Rail yards in Ontario
Rail transport in Whitby, Ontario
Transport buildings and structures in the Regional Municipality of Durham